WNJB-FM (89.3 FM) is a radio station licensed to Bridgeton, New Jersey. The station is owned by The Bridge of Hope, Inc., and simulcasts the Christian adult contemporary programming of WKNZ in Harrington, Delaware.

In November 2022 WHYY, Inc. announced it would sell WNJB-FM to The Bridge of Hope, Inc., a non-profit Christian radio broadcaster based in Harrington, Delaware. The sale was approved by the Federal Communications Commission and the station changed formats in February 2023.

History

The station was formerly owned and operated by the New Jersey Network. NJN's radio network began operation May 20, 1991, when WNJT-FM in Trenton signed on. Eight other stations would be established over the following seventeen years.

On June 6, 2011, the New Jersey Public Broadcasting Authority agreed to sell five FM stations in southern New Jersey to WHYY. The transaction was announced by Governor Chris Christie, as part of his long-term goal to end State-subsidized public broadcasting.  The five stations previously belonged to New Jersey Network's statewide radio service.  WHYY assumed control of the stations through a management agreement on July 1, 2011, pending Federal Communications Commission (FCC) approval for the acquisition; at that point, the stations began to carry the WHYY-FM schedule.

In December 2022, The Bridge of Hope Inc. announced their purchase of WNJB. The sale closed in February 2023.

References

External links
 WNJB official website

NJB-FM
Radio stations established in 1996
1996 establishments in New Jersey
Contemporary Christian radio stations in the United States